Benaičiai-1 Wind Park is one of the largest wind parks in Lithuania and the Baltic States. It is located next to the Laukžemė Wind Park.

References

External links

 Renerga official website

Wind farms in Lithuania
2010 establishments in Lithuania